Miku is a village in Setomaa Parish, Võru County, southeastern Estonia.

References

 

Villages in Võru County